Dominic Zapata (born February 14, 1971), is a Filipino television and film director. He is a graduate of the De La Salle University-Manila and Don Bosco Technical Institute-Makati. He took up AB Communication Arts and BSC Marketing Management (CAM-MMG) at De La Salle University-Manila, where he entered the communication arts program in 1988. He is now one of the resident directors of GMA Network since 1997.
 
His most noted work is My Husband's Lover, nominated as Best Telenovela in the 2014 International Emmy Awards held at New York City. The same project also got him a nomination nod for Best Director at the Asian TV Awards in Singapore that same year.
 
Zapata first became known for directing large-scale soaps, namely Mar's Ravelo's Darna (both versions, first with Angel Locsin and the updated Marian Rivera starrer) and Captain Barbell. He showed his versatility with the musical soap, Diva.  He did local adaptations of international titles like the Kim Samsoon (Korea), La Lola (Argentina), Zaido (Japan) and Zorro (US).
 
His Filipino version of the Korean drama, Temptation of Wife and My Beloved were aired in 2012 while Carmela: Ang Pinakamagandang Babae sa Mundong Ibabaw was aired in 2014. Then came the commercial and critical success of My Husband's Lover. Aside from television shows, Dominic directed films such as Kuya, Mulawin: The Movie, My Valentine Girl, and Boy Pick-up the Movie.
 
In 2005, he won the Metro Manila Film Festival People's Choice Award for Best Director for his work on Mulawin, the Movie. He also won five citations in the 5th Golden Screen TV Awards. He was nominated in the 2014 Asian Television Awards in the Best Direction category, nominated in the 9th Seoul International Drama Awards and also nominated for an International Emmy Award under the Telenovela category, given by the International Academy of Television Arts & Sciences.

Filmography

Awards and nominations

References

1971 births
Living people
American film directors
American television directors
Filipino television directors
American artists of Filipino descent
De La Salle University alumni
GMA Network (company) people